Risley Cricket Club is an amateur cricket club based in Risley, Derbyshire, with a history dating back to at least 1872.

Ground
The club's ground and pavilion 'The Club House' is located 200m up the track, off the Derby Road, behind Treetops Hospice on the south side of Risley, Derbyshire and the ground is rated by the DCCL as a Grade A ground.

History
It is not known when the club was established, but the earliest known record of cricket associated with the village of Risley is a reference in the Nottingham Journal on 12 September 1872, reporting a match between Risley and Sandiacre. The club's ground is currently south of the village, at the end of a track to a field behind the Treetops Hospice. Before this, the club led a peripatetic existence. The earliest known location for the club was a field next to All Saints' church, in the 1920s. By the 1930s, games took place behind the Blue Ball pub (now The Risley Park). After the Second World War, a Rev Hughes arranged for matches to be played on the Risley Hall Approved School ground, until the mid-1970s when they then moved onto a pitch on the Friesland School grounds. Between 1984-88, home games were played at the former Draycott CC Hopwell Road ground, in Draycott, before returning to the Risley Hall School in the late-1980s. In the early 1990s the 1st XI team finished top of the LECA Evening League's Division 3, 2 and 1 in successive years (1991–93) shortly before moving onto the Treetops Hospice ground in 1994.

The club currently has two senior teams competing in the Derbyshire County Cricket League and a long-established junior training section that play competitive cricket in the Erewash Young Cricketers League.

Club performance
The Derbyshire County Cricket League competition results showing the club's positions in the league (by division) since 2014.

 
 
 

The South Nottinghamshire Cricket League competition results showing the club's position (by Division) between 2005–2013.

The Newark Club Cricket Alliance Sunday League competition results showing the club's position (by Division) between 2010–13.

Club Honours

See also
Club cricket

References

External links
 The Club Play-Cricket website
 Derbyshire County Cricket League Official Play-Cricket website

English club cricket teams
Cricket in Derbyshire
1872 establishments in England
Club cricket